Darwin David Rivas Ferrin (born January 12, 1990) is an Ecuadorian football defender currently playing for Barcelona.

See also
Football in Ecuador
List of football clubs in Ecuador

References

External links
FEF Player card

1990 births
Living people
Sportspeople from Esmeraldas, Ecuador
Association football defenders
Ecuadorian footballers
Barcelona S.C. footballers